This is a list of individuals and events related to Azerbaijan in 2023.

Incumbents

Events

Ongoing 

 In 2015, Turkey and Azerbaijan agreed to boost mutual trade to US$15 billion by 2023.

January 

 January 5 — Ilham Aliyev and Mehriban Aliyeva attended inauguration of "STEAM Innovation Center" in the Yasamal raion of Baku.
 January 6 — Ilham Aliyev attended inauguration of "Baku SME house" in Narimanov raion of Baku.
 January 11
 Italian Minister of Defence Guido Crosetto visited Azerbaijan and met Ilham Aliyev in Baku.
 Mukhtar Mammadov was appointed ambassador to Israel.
 The newly appointed ambassador of Azerbaijan to Cuba, Ruslan Rzayev, presented his credentials to the President of Cuba, Miguel Díaz-Canel.
 January 14
 The newly appointed ambassador of Azerbaijan to France, Leyla Abdullayeva, presented her credentials to President of France, Emmanuel Macron.
 The newly appointed ambassador of Azerbaijan to the Vatican, Ilgar Mukhtarov, presented his credentials to head of the Catholic Church, Pope Francis.
 January 15 — Ilham Aliyev visited the UAE and met President of the UAE Mohammed bin Zayed Al Nahyan in Abu Dhabi.
 January 22 — Four people are killed and six others are injured in a fire at a two-story cottage in Qusar.
 January 29 — Azerbaijan suspends diplomatic activities at its embassy in Tehran after accusing Iran of failing to ensure the security of its embassy staff.

February 

 16 February – Armenia submits a peace treaty to Azerbaijan in an effort to end the decades-long conflict between the two countries.

March 

 5 March – Nagorno-Karabakh conflict: Three Armenian police officers and two Azerbaijani soldiers are killed during border clashes near the Lachin Corridor. Both nations accuse each other of opening fire first.

Predicted and scheduled events

March 
 March 9 — March 11 — X Global Baku Forum

April 
 April 28 — April 30 — 2023 Azerbaijan Grand Prix (Baku)

October 
 October 4 — October 8 — IX Baku International Book Fair

Sports 

 2022–23 Azerbaijan Premier League
 UEFA Euro 2024 qualifying Group F

Deaths

January 

 January 3 — Sayyad Shairov, poet (b. 1945)
 January 4 — Neron Babakhanov, doctor of geography, professor (b. 1939) 

 January 5 — Mahir Muradov, judge of the Constitutional Court of Azerbaijan (b. 1956)
 January 7 — Ahmad Gasimov, statesman, deputy (b. 1940)
 January 10
 Nadir Mammadov, doctor of geography, professor (b. 1941)
 Geys Sultanov, scientist, doctor of physical and mathematical sciences, professor (b. 1939)
January 11 — Mehdi Mukarramoglu, journalist (b. 1952)
 January 16 — Seyfeddin Ganiyev , folklorist, doctor of philological sciences, professor (b. 1952)
 January 17 — Namiq Nasrullayev, politician, minister of economy, 1st chairman of the Chamber of Accounts (b. 1945)
 January 22 — Tunzale Aliyeva, actress (b. 1973)

References 

2023 in Azerbaijan
2020s in Azerbaijan
Years of the 21st century in Azerbaijan
Azerbaijan
Azerbaijan